Cometas de Querétaro was a basketball team in Santiago de Querétaro, Querétaro, Mexico playing in the Liga Nacional de Baloncesto Profesional (LNBP). Their home arena was Auditorio General Arteaga which holds 3,000 people and opened in 1985.

Roster

 Reggie Jordan
 Albert Burditt
 Ricky de Aragon 
 Ronald Pittman
 Will Porter
 Jorge Morales
 Richard Carroll
 Stephanoni
 Carlos Zavala
 Luis Villar

References

Defunct basketball teams in Mexico
Sports teams in Querétaro
Querétaro City